Datu Gumbay Piang (1905 - 1946) was a Maguindanaon leader.

Gumbay Piang was born in Dulawan, Cotabato, in 1905, a son of the Moro leader Datu Piang from his sixth wife, Polindao. He was trained as a pedagogist at the (then US Administered) Philippine Normal School in Manila. Gumbay worked his way through the bureaucracy where he served for different school boards of his province.

When the Second World War erupted, Gumbay Piang, along with fellow Moro leaders such as Salipada Pendatun, organized the famed resistance group named the Moro-Bolo Battalion during the Japanese occupation of the Philippines to fight the Japanese. The insignia of the group was the bolo and the kris, the respective weapons of Christian and Muslim populations, respectively, symbolizing a united front against the Japanese aggressors. The Moro-Bolo Battalion consisted of about 20,000 men. Gumbay Piang's Cotabato Moros used Bolo knives to fight the Japanese, and swore that they would "fight to the last".

He was forced to retire from the resistance as a prisoner of war as he suffered chronic asthma attacks. When the Philippines was liberated from the Japanese Imperial forces. Gumbay Piang ran for congress in the First Republic of the Philippines. In 1946, he succumbed to death due to asthma, and his death marked the quiet exit of the Piangs from national politics.

References

External links
Descendants of Datu Piang

1905 births
1946 deaths
History of the Philippines (1898–1946)
Filipino datus, rajas and sultans
Paramilitary Filipinos
World War II Philippine resistance members
Deaths from asthma
People from Maguindanao
Philippine Normal University alumni
Filipino politicians of Chinese descent